Strong Guy is the alias of Guido Carosella, a fictional superhero appearing in American comic books published by Marvel Comics. He was created by Chris Claremont and Bill Sienkiewicz and first appeared in The New Mutants #29 (July 1985).

Publication history
Strong Guy first appears in The New Mutants #29 (July 1985) as Lila Cheney's bodyguard known only as Guido. The character joins X-Factor in issue #71 in the series of the same name, and is first called Strong Guy in X-Factor #72. Guido's struggles with picking a codename are used for comic effect in the story, and X-Factor writer Peter David admitted that in real life he had difficulty coming up with a decent codename for the character.

Fictional character biography

Early life
Born in Rhinebeck, New York to working class Italian parents, Guido Carosella gained a fortune in a settlement when his parents were killed by falling space debris. Skinny and shy, Guido's mutant powers were triggered in childhood when an incident with schoolyard bullies and being hit by a bus ended in his body becoming disproportionately large and over-muscled, separating the already withdrawn boy further from his peers. He had the love and support of his aunt and uncle, who took him in after his parents' deaths. Guido coped with his emotional and physical pain caused by his mutation by developing an outgoing "public face", rarely letting even those close to him see him in any discomfort.

During the incident with the bus, another boy, Charlie Ronalds, was hurt by Guido's flailing. Due to luck, Charlie survived with only a slight limp. He would later become the villainous Charon.

Lila Cheney and Muir Island
After losing much of his fortune, Guido begins to take on jobs that allow him to maintain his luxurious lifestyle. This leads to Guido becoming the long-time roadie and bouncer for the mutant musician Lila Cheney. He later finds Dazzler near Lila Cheney's Malibu house, and helps rescue her from drowning. He then finds the injured Lila Cheney when she teleported back to Malibu, and accompanies Cheney to seek help from the X-Men. Guido is later among the mutants living on Muir Island who are mentally controlled by the telepath Shadow King. In order to satiate his bloodlust, the Shadow King encourages arena fighting amongst the Muir Island personnel. Guido receives a serious beating at the hands of Rogue. After the Shadow King is defeated, several of the Muir Island mutants, with the help of Val Cooper, are recruited to form a new X-Factor, a team of government operatives.

X-Factor
Guido's teammates are Havok, Polaris, Wolfsbane and Quicksilver. Required to come up with a codename, Guido announces himself as "Strong Guy" at an X-Factor press conference after hearing a reporter say, "He must be the strong guy! Every super-group has a strong guy!".

Mister Sinister manipulates Strong Guy into destroying the Washington Monument while fighting Slab. With X-Factor, he aids the American-supported Trans-Sabal government in a war against rebels, and fights the Hulk, then clashes with the Mutant Liberation Front. He also fights the Brotherhood of Evil Mutants.

During his time on the team there is a blossoming relationship with a powerful Genoshan mutant and political dissident named Jo Beth. Strong Guy suffers a deep depression after being poisoned by Cyber, the leader of the mercenary group Hell's Belles. While at a governmental laboratory where a cure was developed, Havok seemingly drinks a sample of the poison himself, in order to show Strong Guy that he is with him. Strong Guy later participates in the battle that defeats the Hell's Belles, though Cyber himself escapes after colliding with a subway train. Another subway train incident turns out much worse, as Strong Guy investigates a train crash where a small dog was the only survivor. Inevitably, the carnage deeply affected his morale.

In the 1992 miniseries "The Infinity War", Strong Guy participates in Earth superheroes' war against the Magus. He is specifically chosen to be one of the heroes to mystically travel the dimensions. He first participated in a fight with the alien Infinity Watch, holding up against such cosmic powerhouses as Drax the Destroyer. He later played a vital part in the final battle against the villain's doppelganger's hordes, though this was a distraction so other forces could go in and defeat the villain.

Strong Guy is one of the many heroes sucked into the after-effects of the Infinity War. He is one of many free-thinking heroes who traveled to an alternate Earth to regain their brainwashed friends and defeat the plans of the cosmic powered Goddess. He teams up with Firestar from the New Warriors, who is dispatched by the brainwashed duo of Puck and Spider-Man. Strong Guy defeats Spider-Man in battle.

Strong Guy's old friend, the cosmic teleporter Lila Cheney, shows up again and tries to persuade him to resume his former role as her roadie/bodyguard. He declines, explaining that he enjoys his life in X-Factor, where she reluctantly returns him.

Strong Guy also develops a deep friendship with Wolfsbane. They go on a road trip with the mutant Random, where Guido shows Rahne his hometown friends. Guido personally escorts Wolfsbane to Muir Island, when she needs specific medical attention. His other best friend on the team, Multiple Man, seemingly perishes in an attempt to remove the Legacy Virus from his body.

Strong Guy remains a member of X-Factor until an incident in the South Seas island nation of Madripoor. Again involved with Lila Cheney, the team becomes trapped in a confrontation between her and the alien race, the K'Lanti. Lila had stolen an object of great value, called the Harmonium, during the midst of political chaos. The aliens, after destroying a city block, disperse diamond shaped bombs throughout the city. Despite the neutralization of the bombs and the return of their object, the aliens leave behind one last explosive. Guido absorbs the energy of its explosion. Despite releasing some of the energy with powerful punches, he suffers a powerful heart attack.

Strong Guy spends much time in suspended animation, until the return of his seemingly-dead friend the Multiple Man, Jaime Madrox. Not fully understanding the situation, Madrox frees Guido, who continues to suffer. Forge creates a device to heal Guido. Afterward he chooses to accompany Lila and her band in their travels instead of rejoining the increasingly fractious X-Factor team. Then he becomes involved in a property dispute between warring alien races, both of whom wish to control a small, barren moon. This dispute is settled when the moon is destroyed during an exchange of weapons on both sides.

Strong Guy was later seen in Tokyo as a member of a mutant fighting club called the Arena, in which the mutant fighters were being secretly enslaved by other mutants. He helped Storm and Callisto in taking down the enslavers.

X-Factor Investigations
In writer Peter David's second run on X-Factor, which begins in late 2005 in the aftermath Marvel's "Decimation" storyline, Strong Guy moves to New York City to become the enforcer for his friend Madrox's detective agency, X-Factor Investigations, on which this incarnation of the X-Factor series is centered. In so doing, he rejoins many of his former teammates from the previous, government-sponsored incarnation of X-Factor. The team included Wolfsbane, Rictor, Siryn and Monet at first.

Strong Guy is assigned to protect a former employee of Singularity Investigations, Henry Buchanan. Henry has proof of the illegal activities of his former company. However, Guido instead kills the man and then called Singularity CEO Damian Tryp, revealing he was working as a mole inside X-Factor.

Strong Guy tries to tell the team that the man had vanished on him but Wolfsbane smells his blood on Guido's hands and a psychic scan by Monet reveals the truth. It seemed Guido had been subjected to hypnotic conditioning by Tryp to turn him into a mole (which explained his rougher attitude and some inconsistencies in his personality).

A visit with Henry's widow did not go as expected; instead of reacting angrily, Alix Buchanan understood the circumstances in which Guido had acted, and forgave him. By the end of the issue they had found solace together in their mutual grief from Henry's death.

Some time later, Valerie Cooper contacts Guido and offered him a job as sheriff of Mutant Town, the affected area in New York where large amounts of former mutants live. Guido informs Jamie Madrox that he will be taking the job, but changes his mind when Mutant Town is destroyed by the villain Arcade.

Guido dies while engaged in a job to protect J. Jonah Jameson from some super-powered assassins. He is shot through the heart; however, the cause of death is from overtaxing his damaged organ by stopping a Mandroid from falling onto a crowd. He is rushed to the hospital, but the doctors are unable to save him due to the damage to his heart. A few minutes later, however, he miraculously revives, showing no injuries. It is revealed that Layla Miller resurrected him; however, as a consequence of this he no longer has a soul. As a result, Guido begins acting more aggressive, and after a frustrating failed date with M, quits the group, only to return during the Hell on Earth War where he works for Mephisto against the other Hell Lords. By the end of the event, he murders Wolfsbane's son Tier in order to become the Supreme Hell Lord.

When the Thunderbolts were accidentally transported to Hell, Mephisto took the opportunity to give them a way out if they defeated Strong Guy. Red Hulk convinced Strong Guy to abandon the position of Hell Lord and try to regain his lost soul allowing Mephisto to regain the throne and let the Thunderbolts return to Earth. When Red Hulk offered Strong Guy to return with the Thunderbolts, Strong Guy states that he will stay behind until he can regain his soul.

Return to Earth

Strong Guy returns in Death of X, along with other mutants, helping the X-Men.

During the "Secret Empire" storyline, Strong Guy is seen amongst the inhabitants of the mutant nation of New Tian following Hydra's takeover of the United States.

New Mutants: Dead Souls
At some point, Strong Guy joins Magik's team of New Mutants, and is revealed to have his soul back with the help of Magik. He also reconciles with Rahne after he apologizes for killing her son. While fighting with Tran Coy Manh, Strong Guy is able to take a hold of him and Magik is forced to banish both of them to Limbo, where time passes differently. Magik is able to summon him back when she is attacked by her teammates, who are infected with the Transmode virus and are controlled by an insane Karma. However, despite only a few days passing in the real world, it has been years from Strong Guy's perspective. During the fight, he suffers from a heart attack, although techno-organic Dani saves him by infecting him with the virus. He then infects Magik.

Last X-Men and Death
A still techno-organic Strong Guy is held captive by O*N*E, who have put him inside a Sentinel along with the rest of his teammates. He is rescued by Cyclops and Wolverine. When duplicates of Multiple Man are blown up by O*N*E, Strong Guy saves everyone by absorbing the kinetic energy. However, it proves to be fatal. Strong Guy is later seen on Krakoa, having been brought back to life like so many other mutants.

Powers and abilities
Strong Guy possesses superhuman strength which he can increase by absorbing kinetic energy and use it to enhance his physical strength to an unmeasured limit. He cannot store the energy he absorbs for very long; as a rule he must physically expend the energy within 90 seconds to prevent it from permanently distorting his body. He is in constant pain from the existing distortion, although he hides it well, traditionally playing the role of team comedian to distract himself.  Guido also possesses superhuman stamina and durability.

An unusual percentage of his body mass is stored in the upper half of his body, causing him to appear top-heavy and thus very imposing.  Strong Guy's powers first appeared after being beaten by bullies and hit by a bus; unable to expel the energy, his body was permanently warped. Strong Guy's maximum strength level is such that he has sufficient power to move the Blob, or briefly stand toe to toe with the Hulk, although the latter's rage-enhanced strength was so powerful that the energy of channeling merely one blow put Strong Guy in danger of a heart attack afterwards. Guido is formidable at hand-to-hand combat in the style of street fighting.

Guido has a gifted intellect and is a talented musical comedy actor and stand-up comedian. He has earned a Bachelor of Arts in drama from New York University.

Strong Guy is nearsighted and wears corrective "bottlecap" lenses.

Reception
 In 2014, Entertainment Weekly ranked Strong Guy 94th in their "Let's rank every X-Man ever" list.
 In 2018, CBR.com ranked Strong Guy 8th in their "Age Of Apocalypse: The 30 Strongest Characters In Marvel's Coolest Alternate World" list.

Other versions
In the "Age of Apocalypse" time line, Strong Guy was still Lila Cheney's bodyguard, but he was much more obsessive about her. He was jealous, almost to the point of insanity, of Gambit because he and Cheney were lovers. Strong Guy was captured by Apocalypse's Infinites and had a bomb implanted in his skull. To save his own life, he betrayed the X-Men and even kidnapped Rogue and Magneto's infant son. He is later killed by Rogue for his betrayal, after she absorbs all the kinetic energy stored in his body, negating his invulnerability. She then blasts the vulnerable Guido with the energy she had absorbed.

In other media
Strong Guy appears in X-Men: The Animated Series as a member of X-Factor.

Merchandise
Bowen Designs produced a Strong Guy Mini-Bust, sculpted by Jeremy Pelletier, July 2012.  It was released in Phase 5, Bust # 288. It measures approx. 9.5 inches tall.

In 1993, Toy Biz released an action figure of Strong Guy sporting his X-Factor uniform as part of their X-Men series. The figure featured "Power Punch" action.

Marvel and Planet Studios released a 1.25 inch/3.175 cm Full Figure pin of Strong Guy, 1994.

Hasbro released a 6" scale action figure of Strong Guy as the Build-A-Figure for a wave of Deadpool and X-Men characters in their Marvel Legends line in 2020.

References

External links
 Strong Guy at Marvel.com
 Strong Guy at Marvel Wiki
 Strong Guy at Comic Vine
 Strong Guy at UncannyXmen.net

Characters created by Bill Sienkiewicz
Characters created by Chris Claremont
Comics characters introduced in 1985
Fictional actors
Fictional bodyguards
Fictional characters from New York (state)
Fictional comedians
Fictional Italian American people
Fictional private investigators
Marvel Comics characters with superhuman strength
Marvel Comics mutants
X-Factor (comics)